Ammobates dusmeti is a species of bee in the family Apidae. The species is recorded in Spain and France.

References

Apidae
Insects described in 1951